Sarah Solovay (born March 30, 1994) professionally known as Solly, is an American singer and songwriter from New York City, currently residing in Los Angeles. In 2018, Solovay signed a worldwide publishing agreement with Wide Eyed Entertainment and Pulse Music Group. She has collaborated with Shawn Mendes, Bebe Rexha, Jason Derulo, Aloe Blacc, Galantis, Steve Aoki, Nessa Barrett, Hayden James, and Icona Pop. Solovay was a vocalist on singles released by Galantis and Taska Black, and provided additional vocals for the Jason Derulo 2020 single, "Take You Dancing," which was RIAA-Certified Platinum and for which she won a 2022 BMI Pop Award.

Early Years

Solovay began writing songs on guitar at age nine and released her debut EP, Gone, in 2009, at age fifteen. Its title track, "Gone," won the New York Songwriters Circle "Young Songwriters Award." In July, 2010, Solovay opened for John Mayer and Train on Mayer's "Battle Studies World Tour" in Scranton, Pennsylvania. She released her sophomore EP, Superhuman, in 2012, along with a few singles.  During the summer of 2011, Solovay was profiled by The New York Times for being a musician while balancing school work.

In 2016, Solovay graduated from Yale University, where she was an American Studies major with a focus on Visual, Audio, Literary and Performance Culture. She moved back to New York City and released "Rough Draft," in 2017.[3] It was put in rotation on Sirius XM The Pulse's show, "Train Tracks," and added to several Apple Music playlists, including "Future Hits" and "Breaking Pop."

Songwriting discography

Discography

External links
 [ Sarah] on Allmusic

References 

1994 births
American women singer-songwriters
American women pop singers
Living people
Singer-songwriters from New York (state)
21st-century American singers
21st-century American women singers